The Trench in Potter's Field is a black and white photograph produced by Danish-American photographer Jacob A. Riis, probably in 1890, depicting a trench used as a mass grave for tenement residents who died during the period of mass immigration in New York. This photograph was part of the larger work made by Riis to depict the conditions of the lower classes of New York in his photographic and journalistic work.

Immigrants and economic degradation
Immigrants often took shelter in the tenements during the massive immigration through Elis Island in the late 19th century. However, due to the large influx of people immigrating to the United States, the tenement plan shortly failed. There was simply not enough room, resources, or economic stability for people, including children, to survive. Soon, many were unable to afford food and other basic necessities. This eventually led to the bigger problem of not being able to afford living in the already crowded tenements. The depraved poverty that spread throughout New York was the ultimate catalyst in the death toll. Immigrants were already faced with many challenges moving to the United States, on top of the economic state that they came to it in. This helped foreshadow the magnitude of deaths that would occur.

Poverty and death
One of the many horrors that occurred in the tenements of New York were the trenches that were often found. These trenches were used as unmarked, mass graves for those who died in the tenements. Due to the massive amount of poverty suffered by those who were living in tenements, death occurred at a rapid rate, linking poverty and the trenches closely together. People were not able to afford anything; however, they were able to live inside the tenements. Death spread quickly, affecting people's lives at tenements, and ultimately, leading to their bodies being dumped in the trenches.

Analysis
The picture shows six men involved in the task of burying the dead in the common trench. The picture illustrates the depth in which the trenches were created in order to accommodate the body count-nearly three stories deep. Many of the bodies were stacked on top of one another, illustrating those who cannot afford and survive. Death was a matter of impact to housing towards the immigrants. There was nowhere else to get rid of the corpses once they died, except for trenches, even if they pass away inside the tenements. The trenches were a symbol of not only the government and wealthy people's contribution (or lack thereof) to the state New York was in, but the poverty that was suffered by the other half.

Public collections
There are prints of this photograph at the International Center of Photography, in New York, and at the Museum of the City of New York.

References

1890 works
1890 in art
1890s photographs
Photographs by Jacob Riis
Black-and-white photographs